The Margolus–Levitin theorem states that the processing rate of all forms of computation (including quantum computation) cannot be higher than about 6 × 1033 operations per second per joule of energy. The theorem is named for Norman Margolus and Lev B. Levitin, who derived this fundamental limit on the rate of computation.

Stating the bound for one bit is as follows:

See also 
 Bekenstein bound
 Bremermann's limit
 Landauer's principle
 Kolmogorov complexity
 Koomey's law
 Limits to computation
 Moore's law

References 
 

 Lloyd, Seth; Ng, Y. Jack, "Black Hole Computers", Scientific American (April 2007), p. 53–61

Quantum information science
Limits of computation